Executive protection (EP), also known as close protection, refers to security and risk mitigation measures taken to ensure the safety of VIPs or other individuals who may be exposed to elevated personal risk because of their employment, high-profile status, net worth, affiliations or geographical location.

Overview
Protective measures may include home security systems, bodyguards, armored vehicles and vehicle scramble plans, mail screening, private jet travel, background checks for other employees, and other precautions. Executive protection may also provide security for immediate and/or extended family members to prevent kidnapping and extortion.

Executive protection is its own highly specialized field within the private security industry. Elite executive protection professionals will have specialized training in executive protection, driving, first aid, and marksmanship.

The term executive protection was coined in the 1970s by the United States Secret Service when they created the Executive Protection Service to guard visiting foreign dignitaries.

In the United States, executive protection services are regulated at the state level and in most cases require licensing, insurance, training and a separate concealed carry permit.  Also, the Law Enforcement Officers Safety Act of 2004 (aka HR-218) does not serve as a license for off-duty law enforcement officers to provide executive protective services.  Hiring unlicensed, uninsured protection services, including those offered by off-duty law enforcement officers, creates direct liability for the client.

Any bona fide executive protection firm should be able to provide a prospective client with their:

 State-issued Corporate Business License (HR-218 or status as a retired law enforcement officer does not replace this document)
 State-issued registration to provide protective services (HR-218 or status as a retired law enforcement officer does not replace this document)
 Copy of current liability insurance
 Personal certificates of initial and ongoing executive protection training for each agent
 State-issued registrations to provide protective services for each agent
 State-issued registrations allowing the agent to carry weapons for professional use. (HR-218 or status as a retired law enforcement officer does not replace this document)
 State-issued concealed carry permits for each agent (HR-218 may replace this document)

An executive protection team may have agents performing in a variety of roles to better protect the client, including:

 Detail Leader
 Assistant Detail Leader (Detail Manager)
 Tactical Commander
 Motorcade Lead
 Advance Lead 
 Mobile Agent
 Static Agent
 Protective Intelligence Agent

Executive protection occasionally becomes an item of general public interest, usually when it fails. For example:

 On July 19, 2011, Rupert Murdoch was pied in London during a Parliamentary hearing.
 In 1998, Microsoft co-founder Bill Gates was pied in Belgium.

There are varying types of executive protection. They can generally be divided into the following categories:
 
 High-threat protection for dignitaries traveling internationally
 Corporate executive protection for high net-worth corporate officers
 Celebrity close protection

The defining characteristics among these categories are first, the amount of resources available for the task, and second the types of environments that they operate in on a routine basis.

See also 
 Security detail

References

Further reading
 Aitch, Richard (2012). "Close Protection - A Closer Observation of the Protection Equation". London, UK. 
 June, Dale (1998). Introduction to Executive Protection. Boca Raton, Fla.: CRC Press. 978-0849381287.
 Oatman, Robert (2006). Executive Protection: New Solutions for a New Era. Baltimore, Md.: Noble House. 978-1561679423.
 Braunig, Martha J. (1993). The Executive Protection Bible. Aspen, Colo.: ESI Education Development Corp. .
 De Becker, Gavin (2002). Fear Less: Real Truth About Risk, Safety, and Security in a Time of Terrorism. Boston: Little, Brown. .
 De Becker, Gavin (1997). The Gift of Fear: Survival Signals That Protect Us from Violence. Boston: Little, Brown. .
 De Becker, Gavin, Thomas A. Taylor, and Jeff Marquart (2008). Just 2 Seconds: Using Time and Space to Defeat Assassins: with a Compendium of Attacks against at-Risk Persons. Studio City, Calif.: Gavin de Becker Center for the Study and Reduction of Violence.  . [www.just2seconds.org]
 De Becker, Gavin (1999). Protecting the Gift: Keeping Children and Teenagers Safe (and Parents Sane). New York: Dial Press. .
 Karlin, Susan (November 8, 2007). "Covering Your Assets". Condé Nast Portfolio.
 Karlin, Susan (November 8, 2007). "How to Choose an Executive Protection Firm". Condé Nast Portfolio.
 Karlin, Susan (December 9, 2007). "The Secret Weapon of the Stars". ISRAEL21c.
 Kobetz, Richard W., ed. (1991). Providing Executive Protection.  Executive Protection Institute. , .
 Kobetz, Richard W., ed. (1994). Providing Executive Protection, Volume II. : Executive Protection Institute. .
 Oatman, Robert L. (1997). The Art of Executive Protection. Baltimore, Md.: Noble House. .
Colliver,"Rick"R.E.(2011)."Principal Protection; Lessons learned". Dublin, Oh.: Terrapin Group Publications. 
Patrick Van Horne and Jason A. Riley (2014). "Left of Bang How the Marine Corps' Combat Hunter Program Can Save Your Life". New York, NY: Black Irish Entertainment LLC. .

Security